The 29th European Film Awards were presented on 10 December 2016 in Wrocław, Poland. The ceremony is one of a number of events to take place in Wrocław as the city is a 2016 European Capital of Culture, along with San Sebastián. The nominations and winners were selected by more than 2,500 members of the European Film Academy.

Ceremony 
The ceremony focused on a political message against ongoing nationalism and euroscepticism. The European Film Academy also remarked on Ukrainian filmmaker Oleh Sentsov, who is imprisoned in Russia.

Selection

 24 Weeks
 A Man Called Ove
 A War
 Being 17
 Beyond the Mountains and Hills
 Chevalier
 Dawn
 Death in Sarajevo
 Don't Be Bad
 Elle
 Florence Foster Jenkins
 Frenzy
 Graduation
 I, Daniel Blake
 I, Olga Hepnarová
 Julieta
 Kills on Wheels
 Köpek
 Land of Mine
 Letters from War
 Like Crazy
 Lost in Munich
 Mammal
 Mimosas
 On the Other Side
 One of Us
 Perfect Strangers
 Pyromaniac
 Rauf
 Room
 Sieranevada
 Song of Songs
 Sparrows
 Strange Haven
 Suffragette
 Suntan
 The Ardennes
 The Commune
 The Happiest Day in the Life of Olli Mäki
 The Lure
 The Olive Tree
 The Paradise Suite
 The People vs. Fritz Bauer
 The Student
 The Unknown Girl
 Things to Come
 Tikkun
 Toni Erdmann
 Truman
 United States of Love

Awards voted by EFA Members

Best Film
The nominees were announced on 6 November 2016 in Seville, Spain at the Seville European Film Festival. Four films nominated for Best Film were premiered at the Cannes Film Festival, including the Palme d’Or winner I, Daniel Blake, and FIPRESCI Critics Award Toni Erdmann. One film (Room) has been already nominated for the Best Picture at the 88th Academy Awards. Three films (Toni Erdmann, Elle, Julieta) had been submitted for Best Foreign Language Film at the 89th Academy Awards. Two films (I, Daniel Blake, Toni Erdmann) received nominations at the 18th British Independent Film Awards.

Toni Erdmann is the first film directed by a woman to win best picture.

Best Comedy
The nominees were announced on 25 October 2016.

Best Director
The nominees were announced on 6 November 2016

Best Screenwriter
The nominees were announced on 6 November 2016

Best Actress
The nominees were announced on 6 November 2016

Best Actor
The nominees were announced on 6 November 2016.

Technical awards
A special seven-member jury convened in Berlin and, based on the selection list. The members of the jury were: 
Benoît Barouh, production designer, France 
Paco Delgado, costume designer, Spain 
Martin Gschlacht, cinematographer, Austria 
Dean Humphreys, sound designer, UK 
Era Lapid, editor, Israel 
Waldemar Pokromski, make-up artist, Poland 
Giuliano Taviani, composer, Italy.

Best Composer
The winners were announced on 17 November 2016.

Best Cinematographer
The winners were announced on 17 November 2016.

Best Editor
The winners were announced on 17 November 2016.

Best Production Designer
The winners were announced on 17 November 2016.

Best Costume Designer
The winners were announced on 17 November 2016.

Best Sound Designer
The winners were announced on 17 November 2016.

Best Makeup and Hairstyling
The winners were announced on 17 November 2016.

Critics Award

European Discovery
The nominees were announced on 19 September 2016. Award given by International Federation of Film Critics - Prix FIPRESCI.

Best Animated Feature Film
The nominees were announced on 25 October 2016. Two films nominated for Best Animated Feature Film were premiered at the Cannes Film Festival. One film (My Life as a Courgette) has been submitted for Best Foreign Language Film at the 89th Academy Awards. My Life as a Courgette also in official selection for The European Parliament's LUX Prize.

Audience awards

People's Choice Award
The nominees were announced on 1 September 2016.

Best Children and Family Film
The winners were announced on 10 May 2016.

University Award
The announcement of the five European University Film Award nominations took place during Filmfest Hamburg on 5 October 2016. Films were selected by: Feo Aladag (director/Germany), Dagmar Brunow (academic, Linnaeus University/Sweden), Luis Martinez Lopez (journalist, EL MUNDO/Spain), Myroslav Slaboshpytskiy (director/Ukraine) and Patrick Sobelman (producer/France). Five nominated films were screened and discussed in the respective classes and each university voted its favourite film.
The following 13 universities from 13 European countries participated:
 Czech Republic: Charles University/Prague
 France: Université Sorbonne Nouvelle Paris 3
 Germany: University of Rostock
 Greece: University of the Aegean/Mytilini (Lesbos)  
 Hungary: Pázmány Péter Catholic University/Budapest
 Ireland: University College Cork
 Italy: University of Udine
 Netherlands: Utrecht University
 Poland: University of Lodz
 Portugal: University of Lisbon
 Sweden:  Linnaeus University/Växjö
 Turkey: Kadir Has University/Istanbul
 United Kingdom: John Moores University/Liverpool

Best Documentary

Best Short Film
To be considered for a nomination, a short film has to screen in competition at any of the participating festivals:
13 - 24 Oct. 2015: Film Fest Gent (Belgium)
19 - 25 Oct. 2015: Uppsala International Short Film Festival (Sweden)
24 - 31 October 2015: Valladolid International Film Festival (Spain)
6 - 15 Nov. 2015: Cork Film Festival (Ireland)
27 Jan. - 7 Feb. 2016: International Film Festival Rotterdam (the Netherlands) 
5 - 13 Feb. 2016: International Short Film Festival Clermont-Ferrand (France)
11 - 21 Feb. 2016: Berlin International Film Festival (Germany)
9 - 13 Mar. 2016: Tampere Film Festival (Finland)
29 May - 5 Jun. 2016: Kraków Film Festival (Poland)
9 - 17 Jul 2016: Curtas Vila do Conde - International Film Festival/ (Portugal)
3 - 13 Aug. 2016: Festival del film Locarno (Switzerland)
12 - 20 Aug. 2016: Sarajevo Film Festival (Bosnia & Herzegovina)
31 Aug. - 10 Sep. 2016: Venice Film Festival (Italy)
19 - 24 Sep. 2016: International Short Film Festival in Drama (Greece)
20 - 25 Sep. 2016: Encounters Short Film and Animation Festival Bristol (UK)

European Co-Production Award — Prix Eurimages
The winners were announced on 15 November 2016.

Honorary Awards

European Achievement in World Cinema
The winner were announced on 1 November 2016.
Award presented by Susanne Bier.

Lifetime Achievement Award
The winner were announced on 13 September 2016.

Honorary Award of the EFA President and Board
Award presented by Wim Wenders.

List of partners
The European Film Awards 2016 are presented by the European Film Academy and EFA Productions in co-operation with:

 the European Capital of Culture Wroclaw 2016, supported by its founders
 the Ministry of Culture and National Heritage of the Republic of Poland 
 and the Polish Film Institute, 
 the National Forum of Music as co-organizer 
 and KGHM Polska Miedź S.A. as strategic partner; 
and with the support of:
 the Creative Europe MEDIA Sub-Programme of the European Union, 
FFA German Federal Film Board, 
German State Minister for Culture and the Media, 
LOTTO Foundation Berlin, 
Medienboard Berlin-Brandenburg, 

 Aveda, 
Euronews, 
Fair Spirits presented by DV-V, 
Filmweb, 
GLS, 
Jägermeister, 
M∙A∙C, 
Mercedes-Benz Duda-Cars, 
Nespresso, 
TVN 
and Volvo.

References

External links 
 

2016 film awards
European Film Awards ceremonies
Culture in Wrocław
2016 in Poland
2016 in Europe